Hestiochora erythrota is a moth of the family Zygaenidae. It is found in Australia from New South Wales and Queensland.

External links
Australian Faunal Directory

Procridinae
Moths described in 1886